Zenta Mauriņa (15 December 1897 – 25 April 1978) was a Latvian writer, essayist, translator, and researcher in philology. She was married to the Electronic Voice Phenomena researcher Konstantin Raudive.

Biography 
Born to doctor Roberts Mauriņš, Zenta spent her childhood in Grobiņa, where, at the age of six, she contracted polio, leaving her confined to a wheelchair for the rest of her life. After studying at the Russian girl's high school in Liepaja (1913–1915), she studied philosophy at the Latvian University in Riga (1921–1923). After this, she studied philology of Baltic languages (1923–1927). She taught at the Latvian Teachers Institute and at the Latvian University in Riga and in Murmuiza, and achieved her doctorate in philology in 1938, researching the works of Latvian poet and philosopher, Fricis Bārda.

At the end of the Second World War, Mauriņa went into exile, first in Germany in 1944, and in 1946 in Sweden, where she became a lecturer at Uppsala University (1949–1963). In 1966, she moved to Bad Krozingen in southern Germany, where she was buried after her death in a hospital in Basel, Switzerland.

Works 
Up to 1944, Mauriņa published 19 books in Latvia, including monographs on Latvian writers Rainis, Jānis Poruks, Anna Brigadere and Fricis Bārda, as well as on Dostoyevsky and Dante. During this period, she also wrote her novel, Life on a Train (1941). After the war, she published 20 books in Latvian, and 27 in German, and her works have been widely translated into Italian, English, Russian, Swedish, Dutch, Finnish and Danish. Notable among her works in German are:
   The Long Journey (Die weite Fahrt) (her autobiography)
   A Prophet of the Soul: Fyodor Dostoievsky (a biography, translated from the Latvian by C. P. Finlayson)
   Heart mosaic (Mosaik des Herzens) (essays)
   In the beginning, was joy (Im Anfang war die Freude) (short stories)
   A loved life – a lived life (Geliebtes Leben – gelebtes Leben) (essays)
  A Portrait of Russian Writers (Porträts russischer Schriftsteller) (essays)

Awards 
 Officer Cross, of the Order of Merit of the Federal Republic of Germany (1968)
 PBLA (World Free Latvians Association) Award (1969)
 Konrad Adenauer Prize, for literature (1971)
 Honorary citizen of Bad Krozingen (1977)

References

1897 births
1978 deaths
People from Gulbene Municipality
People from Kreis Walk
20th-century Latvian women writers
20th-century philologists
Women philologists
Latvian translators
Translators from Latvian
Translators to Latvian
Women linguists
Latvian philologists
20th-century translators
University of Latvia alumni
Latvian World War II refugees
Latvian emigrants to Sweden
Officers Crosses of the Order of Merit of the Federal Republic of Germany
People with polio